Adam's Peak or Śrī Pāda is a  tall conical sacred mountain located in central Sri Lanka. It is well known for the "Śrī Pāda", i.e., "sacred footprint", a   rock formation near the summit. In Buddhist tradition the print is held to be the footprint of the Buddha, in Hindu tradition that of Hanuman or Shiva, i.e., "Mountain of Shiva's Light", and in some Islamic and Christian traditions that of Adam, or that of St. Thomas.

The mountain is also known as Mount Malaya in Buddhist sources, particularly the Mahayana Lankavatara Sutra, which states that the Buddha preached this sutra on top of the mountain. According to this sutra, the mountain was the abode of Rāvanā, overlord of the Raskshasas and ruler of Laṅkā. Other names in Sanskrit sources include Mount Lanka, Ratnagiri (Mountain of Gems), Malayagiri (Mount Malaya) or Mount Rohana.

The mountain is also seen as the abode of the deity Saman and also goes by various names associated with this, including Sumanakūta (Sumana's Mountain) and Samanalakanda (Saman's Mountain or Mountain of the Butteries).

Geography 

The surrounding region is largely forested hills, with no mountain of comparable size nearby. The region along the mountain is a wildlife reserve, housing many species varying from elephants to leopards, and including many endemic species.

Adam's Peak is important as a watershed.  The districts to the south and the east of Adam's Peak yield precious stones—emeralds, rubies and sapphires, for which the island has been famous, and which earned for it the ancient name of Ratnadvipa.

Adam's Peak is the source of three major rivers in Sri Lanka: Kelani River, Walawe River, and the Kalu Ganga (river).

Trails 

Access to the mountain is possible by 6 trails: Ratnapura-Palabaddala, Hatton-Nallathanni, Kuruwita-Erathna, Murraywatte, Mookuwatte and Malimboda. The Nallathanni and Palabaddala routes are most favored by those undertaking the climb, while the Kuruwita-Erathna trail is used less often. These trails are linked to major cities or town by bus, accounting for their popular use. The Murraywatte, Mookuwatte and Malimboda routes are seldom used, but do intersect with the Palabaddala road midway through the ascent. The usual route taken by most pilgrims is ascent via Hatton and descent via Ratnapura. Although the Hatton trail is the steepest, it is also shorter than any of the other trails by approximately five kilometers.

Once one of the starting 'nodes' of Palabadalla, Nallathanni or Erathna are reached, the rest of the ascent is done on foot through the forested mountainside on the steps built into it. The greater part of the track leading from the base to the summit consists of thousands of steps built in cement or rough stones. The trails are illuminated with electric light, making night-time ascent possible and safe to do even when accompanied by children. Rest stops and wayside shops along the trails serve refreshments and supplies.

Whilst there are many ancient monuments on the mountain, there is an important Peace Pagoda located halfway up, built by Nipponzan Myohoji in 1978.

Nomenclature 

Due to its significance to the various people that inhabit the country, the mountain is referred to by a variety of names.

The often used Sri Pada is derived from Sanskrit, used by the Sinhalese people in a religious context; this name also has meaning in Pāli, and may be translated roughly as "the sacred foot". It refers to the footprint-shaped mark at the summit, which is believed by Buddhists to be that of the Buddha. Some Christian and Islamic traditions assert that it is the footprint of Adam, left when first setting foot on Earth after having been cast out of paradise, giving it the name "Adam's Peak". Hindu tradition refers to the footprint as that of the Hindu deity Shiva, and thus names the mountain Shiva padam (Shiva's foot) in Tamil. Tamils may also use the name Shivanolipatha Malai to refer to the mountain.

Another Sinhala name for the mountain is Samanalakanda, which refers either to the deity Saman, who is said to live upon the mountain, or to the butterflies (samanalayā) that frequent the mountain during their annual migrations to the region. The name Sri Paada, however, is the more commonly used.

Other local and historic names include Ratnagiri ("jewelled hill"), Samantakuta ("Peak of Saman"), Svargarohanam ("the climb to heaven"), Mount Rohana and other variations on the root Rohana.

History 

Sri Pada is first mentioned (as Samanthakuta) in the Deepawamsa, the earliest Pali chronicle, (4th century), and also in the 5th century chronicle Mahawamsa, where it is stated that the Buddha visited the mountain peak. The chronicle Rajavaliya states that the  King Valagamba (1st century BCE) had taken refuge in the forests of Adam's Peak against invaders from India, and later returned to Anuradhapura. The Mahawamsa again mentions the visit of King Vijayabahu I (1058–1114) to the mountain. The famous Chinese pilgrim and Buddhist traveler Fa Hien stayed in Sri Lanka in 411–12 CE and mentions Sri Pada although it is not made clear whether he actually visited it.

The Italian merchant Marco Polo in his Travels of 1298 CE noted that Adam's Peak was an important place of pilgrimage but did not mention a footprint in the rock. The Arab traveler Ibn Battuta climbed to the summit of the mountain which he called Sarandīb in 1344 CE. In his description he mentions a stairway and iron stanchions with chains to help the pilgrims. The first ascent of the peak by an Englishman was made by Lieutenant William Malcolm of the 1st Ceylon Regiment on 26 April 1815, from the Ratnapura side; his account of the ascent was published in the Government Gazette on 10 May 1815. John Davy, brother of the noted chemist Sir Humphry Davy, visited the peak in 1817. He recorded observing an oversized foot print carved in stone and ornamented with a single margin of brass and studded with gems.

The Sacred Mountain 

It is revered as a holy site by Buddhists, Hindus, some Muslims and Christians. It has specific qualities that cause it to stand out and be noticed, including its dominant and outstanding profile, and the boulder at the peak containing an indentation resembling a footprint. According to the Encyclopædia Britannica Eleventh Edition:
"For a long period Adam’s Peak was supposed to be the highest mountain in Ceylon, but actual survey makes it only 7353 ft. above sea-level. This elevation is chiefly remarkable as the resort of pilgrims from all parts of the East. The hollow in the lofty rock that crowns the summit is said by the Brahmans to be the footstep of Siva, by the Buddhists of Buddha, by the Mahommedans of Adam, whilst the Portuguese Christians were divided between the conflicting claims of St Thomas and the eunuch of Candace, queen of Ethiopia. The footstep is covered by a handsome roof, and is guarded by the priests of a rich monastery half-way up the mountain, who maintain a shrine on the summit of the peak."

It is an important pilgrimage site, especially for Buddhists. Pilgrims walk up the mountain, following a variety of difficult routes up thousands of steps. The journey takes several hours at least.

The mountain is most often scaled from December to May. During other months it is hard to climb the mountain due to very heavy rain, extreme wind, and thick mist. The peak pilgrimage season is in April, and the goal is to be on top of the mountain at sunrise, when the distinctive shape of the mountain casts a triangular shadow on the surrounding plain and can be seen to move quickly downward as the sun rises.

Legends 

For Buddhists, the footprint mark is the left foot of the Buddha, left behind when Buddha visited Sri Lanka, as a symbol for worship at the invitation of Buddhist God Saman.

Tamil Hindus consider it as the footprint of Lord Shiva. It is also fabled that the mountain is the legendary mount Trikuta, the capital of Ravana during the Ramayana times from where he ruled Lanka.

A bell lies on top of the temple and tradition goes that pilgrims can ring it as many times as they have achieved the pilgrimage to the top of the peak.

Some Muslims and Christians in Sri Lanka ascribe it to where Adam, the first ancestor, set foot as he was exiled from the Garden of Eden.  The legends of Adam are connected to the idea that Sri Lanka was the original Eden, and in the Muslim tradition that Adam was 60 cubits tall.

A shrine to Saman, a Buddhist "deity" (people who have spent spiritual lives during their life on earth and done pacificism service to regions are deified by Sri Lankan Buddhists) charged with protecting the mountain top, can be found near the footprint.

See also 
 Petrosomatoglyph
 List of rivers of Sri Lanka

References

Further reading

External links 

 Sri Pada: Buddhism's most sacred mountain

Mountains of Sri Lanka
Landforms of Ratnapura District
Sacred mountains
Two-thousanders of Asia
Buddhist pilgrimage sites in Sri Lanka
Hindu pilgrimage sites in Sri Lanka
Tourist attractions in Sabaragamuwa Province
Buddhism in Sri Lanka
Sri Lanka
Islam in Sri Lanka